National Route 159 is a national highway of Japan connecting Nanao, Ishikawa and Kanazawa, Ishikawa in Japan, with a total length of .

See also

References

159
Roads in Ishikawa Prefecture